Cephalopods, specifically pertaining to octopuses, squids, nautiluses and cuttlefishes, are most commonly represented in popular culture in the Western world as creatures that spray ink and latch onto things with their tentacles without releasing.

The octopus has been used as a (usually negative) metaphor for entity which is perceived as sending out many "tentacles" from one "center" in order to exert power and control.

Cartoons

The first cephalopod character to play a title role in an American animated cartoon series was the Hanna-Barbera character, Squiddly Diddly. The cartoon series Oswald revolves around the life of the titular blue octopus and his friends. Cephalopods more commonly appear as supporting characters, or make guest appearances. Supporting characters in cartoons include Occy (Allstar's pet octopus) in Snorks, and Squidward Tentacles from the Nickelodeon series SpongeBob SquarePants. Squilliam Fancyson, is another cephalopod character from the same cartoon. Numerous cephalopods have made cameo appearances in the cartoon series Octonauts. The character Eight-Armed Willie from the animated series Flapjack is another example of a cephalopod cameo. In an episode of the computer animated series The Adventures of Jimmy Neutron: Boy Genius, entitled "Nightmare in Retroville", the main character transforms into an octopus.

Comics
Doctor Octopus and Lady Octopus are two supervillains from the Marvel Comics universe. The former was a scientist who augmented his human body by adding four mechanical arms (bringing his total number of limbs to eight). Another villain is Zitzbath Zark, otherwise known as the Octopus, from the hardboiled comic Spirit. The DC Comics hero Aquaman had a pet octopus named Topo who assisted him in a variety of ways, often taking advantage of his multiple limbs.

Film

20,000 Leagues Under the Sea, based on the 1870 novel of that name by Jules Verne, is the best known representation of a giant cephalopod in cinema. The story's plot follows a group of humans who travel in a submarine called Nautilus (another cephalopod reference) and encounter a giant cephalopod. At least five film adaptions of the story exist (1907, 1916, Disney 1954, 1985 and 1997), variously presenting the monster as a squid or an octopus, or a fantastic combination of the two.

Other films which feature giant cephalopods include It Came from Beneath the Sea (1955), Voyage to the Bottom of the Sea (1961), Space Amoeba (1970), Tentacles (1977), Warlords of Atlantis (1978), Octopus (2000), Octopus 2: River of Fear (2001) Kraken: Tentacles of the Deep (2006) Mega Shark Versus Giant Octopus (2009) and Arrival (2016). The Beast (1996) and Deep Rising (1998) both feature squid.

Octopuses have also been depicted in cinema as hybrids, such as in Octaman, which features a mutant humanoid octopus. In the Disney animated movie The Little Mermaid, Ursula (the sea witch) is depicted as a human-octopus hybrid with the torso of a woman and the arms of an octopus in place of her legs. Monster Shark (1984) and Sharktopus (2010) feature fish-octopus hybrids.

Cephalopods have been depicted in animated feature films for family audiences. Finding Nemo (2003) includes a flapjack octopus among its cast of aquatic characters. The sequel Finding Dory features an East Pacific red octopus as a major supporting character. Toy Story 3 (2010) features a toy rubber octopus named Stretch (voiced by Whoopi Goldberg) and Shark Tale (2004) features an octopus named Luca (voiced by Vincent Pastore). An octopus named Dave (voiced by John Malkovich) is the main antagonist in the 2014 Penguins of Madagascar movie. The Australian animated film Dot and the Whale (1986) features a giant octopus with magical powers.

Cuttlefish and their unique attributes have been a recurring topic or plot point in several major films. Captain Jack Sparrow asked feuding pirates to consider the cuttlefish and their capacity for cannibalism in Pirates of the Caribbean: At World's End (2007). Cuttlefish and their hypnotic strobing ability were discussed as the greatest fear of the villainous Ulysses Klaue in Marvel Studios' Avengers: Age of Ultron (2015). In the same year, the DNA of cuttlefish were discussed as contributing to the intelligence and camouflage of the monstrous Indominus rex in the science fiction action film Jurassic World (2015).

Literature
Cthulhu is a fictional deity created by H. P. Lovecraft and first appearing in the short story "The Call of Cthulhu". Cthulhu is portrayed as a malevolent and powerful being that, though for the most part incomprehensible to human understanding, appears to have features reminiscent of an octopus and a dragon. Cthulhu appeared in the three-episode arc of the series South Park that began with the episode "Coon 2: Hindsight".

Other examples of cephalopods in literature include the man-eating squid species Haploteuthis ferox from H. G. Wells' short story "The Sea Raiders". In the Harry Potter franchise, a benevolent giant squid lives in the Black Lake, located next to Hogwarts School of Witchcraft and Wizardry. The Norwegian science fiction novel De heldige tre konger features intelligent cephalopods that occupy the land. In Thomas Pynchon's novel Gravity's Rainbow, octopus Grigori is trained through Pavlovian conditioning to attack the double agent Katje Borgesius.

Music
The Beatles song "Octopus's Garden", the Syd Barrett song "Octopus", the Bloc Party song "Octopus" and the Salmonella Dub song "Octopus" all incorporate octopuses in their song titles or lyrics.  The song "Giant Squids" by Australian musician Baterz speculates about the lives of the animals. The Australian band Do Re Mi wrote and recorded a song called "Cuttlefish Beach", which appears on the album Domestic Harmony. The Australian children's musical group The Wiggles features an octopus as one of their mascots.

Electronic music 
Several musicians, producers and composers of electronic music have names inspired by cephalopods. These include the chip-tune composer Cuttlefish, and the electronic music producers, Tron Sepia (whose name refers to a genus of cuttlefish). Cephalopods are reflected in track titles and the names of several record labels, including: Octopus Records, Octopus Black Label, Black Octopus Sound, Squid and the Stereo, Siamese Squids and Nautilus Recordz. As of 2016, Beatport's electronic music catalog includes 75 releases which include the word "octopus" in their title. Some more creative cephalopod-inspired titles include the Spenghead tracks "Gargantuan Cuttlefish Liasons" and "Romancing the Collossal Squid", the latter of which appears on an EP entitled The Cephalopod.

Video games 

In the sandbox game Minecraft, squids are passive, non-playable characters that carry obtainable ink sacs. In the media franchise Pokémon, Omanyte, Omastar, Octillery, Inkay, Malamar, Clobbopus and Grapploct are all cephalopod-like organisms. Splatoon, a game by Nintendo released in 2015, features shapeshifting squid-kids called Inklings as the player characters. A sequel, Splatoon 2, also released by Nintendo in 2017 featured Inklings and introduced playable shapeshifting octopus-kids called Octolings as part of the Octo Expansion DLC. Night of the Cephalopods (2008) is a free retro pixel art survival game in which human players must fend off levitating cephalopods. A discussion thread on TONMO.com is dedicated to noting appearances of cephalopod characters in video games.

In Galactopus, a homebrew action game for the Atari 2600, the player pilots a spaceship and battles cephalopods in space.

Erotica

Other appearances

Paul the Octopus is an octopus that correctly predicted the outcomes of eleven out of thirteen football matches from the UEFA Euro 2008 Championship and the 2010 FIFA World Cup. Al the Octopus is the mascot of the Detroit Red Wings.

See also
Giant squid in popular culture

References

 
Marine life in popular culture